Reginald Atkins (born December 25, 1967) is an American politician who has represented the 20th Legislative District in the New Jersey General Assembly since taking office on January 11, 2022.

Atkins served as president of the board of education of the Roselle Public Schools from 2007 to 2016. Elected to Roselle Borough Council in 2016, he served as council president from 2018 to 2019, and was elected as mayor, serving from 2020 to 2021.

District 20 
Each of the 40 districts in the New Jersey Legislature has one representative in the New Jersey Senate and two members in the New Jersey General Assembly. The other representatives from the 20th District for the 2022—23 Legislative Session are:
Senator Joseph P. Cryan (D)
Assemblywoman Annette Quijano (D)

References

External links
Legislative webpage

1967 births
Living people
Mayors of places in New Jersey
New Jersey city council members
Democratic Party members of the New Jersey General Assembly
People from Roselle, New Jersey
21st-century American politicians